Asle Bækkedal (9 December 1896 – 6 June 1952) was a Norwegian sprinter. He competed in the men's 100 metres at the 1920 Summer Olympics.

References

External links
 

1896 births
1952 deaths
Athletes (track and field) at the 1920 Summer Olympics
Norwegian male sprinters
Olympic athletes of Norway
Athletes from Oslo